The 2002 Mobil 1 12 Hours of Sebring was the 50th running of this event, and the opening round of the 2002 American Le Mans Series season.  It took place at Sebring International Raceway, Florida, on March 16, 2002.

Official results
Class winners in bold.

† - #25 Konrad Motorsport was disqualified during the race for receiving outside assistance for repairs while still on the track.

Statistics
 Pole Position - #1 Audi Sport North America - 1:48.029
 Fastest Lap - #1 Audi Sport North America - 1:48.418
 Distance - 2060.282 km
 Average Speed - 171.406 km/h

External links
 
 World Sports Racing Prototypes - Race Results

S
12 Hours of Sebring
12 Hours of Sebring
12 Hours Of Sebring
12 Hours Of Sebring